The Omaha Trophy, which is sponsored by the United States Strategic Command (STRATCOM) and the STRATCOM Consultation Committee, is awarded each year to U.S. military units with intercontinental ballistic missiles, strategic aircraft, strategic space and information operations, as well as to the best ballistic missile submarine.  The trophy is currently presented in four official categories:

Global Operations
Intercontinental Ballistic Missile
Strategic Bomber Operations
Submarine Ballistic Missile

Selection for the award in each of the categories is based on formal evaluations, meritorious achievement, safety, and other factors, such as community involvement and humanitarian actions.

History
The Omaha Trophy was created by the Strategic Command Consultation Committee, located in Omaha, Nebraska. The trophy was originally presented as a single trophy to a unit of the U.S. Air Force's Strategic Air Command (SAC) on behalf of the citizens of Omaha. The committee requested the trophy be presented annually to the command's best wing as a token of recognition and appreciation.  It was first presented in 1971, with the number of awards increasing over the years as the U.S. Strategic Command's mission and structure changed.  After the inactivation of Strategic Air Command and the creation of U.S. Strategic Command in 1992, the committee authorized two awards.  One was for the best ICBM or fleet ballistic missile submarine unit, and the other was for the unified command's best strategic aviation unit. In 1998, the missile category was divided into two separate awards, with one to be presented to land-based units, and the other to sea-based missile units. In 2003, a fourth category was added.  This new category was strategic space and information operations, which was used until 2006.  It became the cyberspace category in 2007, and global operations in 2008.  

The current award of the Omaha Trophy reflects the command's primary missions, emphasis on strategic deterrence, and evolving role in global operations.  
The trophy rotates between installations annually. Officials present a miniature, replica trophy or plaque and certificate to each winning unit after the presentation trophy has been returned at the beginning of the next competitive cycle.

Omaha Trophy Honor Wall 
U.S. Strategic Command (USSTRATCOM) and the Strategic Command Consultation Committee (SCC) unveiled the Omaha Trophy Honor Wall at USSTRATCOM headquarters on March 14, 2022. The Omaha Trophy Honor Wall showcases 125 patches from every unit that has received the award in chronological order with room for future recipient units.

References

Military awards and decorations of the United States